This list, 2013 in molluscan paleontology, is a list of new taxa of ammonites and other fossil cephalopods, as well as fossil gastropods, bivalves and other molluscs that have been described during the year 2013.

Ammonites

Other cephalopods

Gastropods

Other molluscs

References

Paleomalacology
Paleontology
2013 in paleontology